24 Aquarii is a triple star system in the equatorial constellation of Aquarius. 24 Aquarii is the Flamsteed designation. The apparent magnitude of this system is 6.66, which, according to the Bortle Dark-Sky Scale, means it is a faint star that is just visible to the naked eye from dark, rural skies. The system is moving closer to the Earth with a heliocentric radial velocity of −16 km/s.

The calculated orbit of the visual binary has a period of 48.65 years and a large eccentricity of 0.868. One study gives the system a stellar classification of F7 III, suggesting it contains an evolved giant star. Other classifications give classes matching F-type main-sequence stars for components Aa and B.

References

External links
 Image 24 Aquarii
 Orbital elements of seven new spectroscopic binaries
 Calculating the Orbit of a Double Star with Visual, Speckle, and Radial Velocity Data

F-type giants
F-type main-sequence stars
Triple star systems
Aquarius (constellation)
Durchmusterung objects
Aquarii, 024
206058
106942